Trochocarpa montana, the mountain tree heath, is an Australian shrub or small tree. It occurs at high altitude from the Barrington Tops to the Dorrigo region of northern New South Wales.

The habitat is above 1000 metres above sea level in cool temperate rainforest, usually dominated by Antarctic Beech or Sassafras.
The Latin specific epithet montana refers to mountains or coming from mountains.

Description
A small tree or shrub. The crooked trunk can be up to 30 cm in diameter, slightly flanged at the base. Often seen a few metres tall, but it can grow to ten metres. The bark is thin, mottled brown, pinkish or fawn in colour. Bark is in scaly patterns. The underbark is much darker in colour.

Leaves alternate, not particularly grouped at the ends of the branchlets as seen in Trochocarpa laurina. Leaves not toothed, elliptic, 1.5 to 7 cm long, 0.4 to 2.5 cm wide, pointed at the tip. Glossy green both sides, paler beneath. Five parallel veins on the leaf, venation more evident under the leaf. New leaves red. Leaf stalks 2 to 3 mm long, hairy.

Small creamy brown flowers appear on spikes from March to July. The fruit is a small flattened drupe; blue to purplish black in colour, maturing from November to February. Within the aril of the drupe is a ten ribbed bony endocarp, each of the ten cells within contains a seed.

References

montana
Ericales of Australia
Trees of Australia
Flora of New South Wales
Trees of mild maritime climate